Meghri is a town and the centre of the Meghri Municipality of the Syunik Province in southern Armenia, near the border with Iran. As of the 2011 census, the population of the town was 4,580. According to the 2020 official estimate, Meghri's population is around 4,500. Meghri is located 376 km south of the capital Yerevan and 73 km south of the provincial capital Kapan.

As a result of the community mergers in 2016, the municipality of Meghri was enlarged to include the surrounding villages of Agarak, Alvank, Aygedzor, Gudemnis, Karchevan, Kuris, Lehvaz, Lichk, Nrnadzor, Shvanidzor, Tashtun, Tkhkut, Vahravar, and Vardanidzor.

Etymology 
Meghri was founded as "Karchavan" in 906 by king Smbat I of Armenia, during the period of the Bagratid Kingdom of Armenia. Later, it was known as Meghri, meaning "honey town" in the Armenian language.

History

Ancient history and Middle Ages 
The area of present-day Meghri has been settled since the Bronze Age. Many archaeological sites are found in the vicinity of the town dating back to the 7th and 6th centuries BC, during the period of the kingdom of Urartu. Historically, it has been part of the Arevik canton of the ancient Syunik province of the Kingdom of Armenia.

With the establishment of the Tatev Monastery in the 8th century, the region of modern-day Meghri witnessed a rapid social and economic development. In 906, the settlement of Karchavan was founded by king Smbat I Bagratuni of the Bagratuni dynasty. In 987, the town (known as Meghri) was included within the newly-founded Armenian Kingdom of Syunik. In 1105, the region of Meghri was occupied by the Seljuks. The town was completely destroyed in 1126 and 1157 by the invading Seljuk forces.

Between the 12th and 15th centuries, Syunik, along with the rest of the historic territories of Armenia, suffered from the Seljuk, Mongol, Aq Qoyunlu and Kara Koyunlu invasions, respectively.

Foreign rule 
At the beginning of the 16th century, Meghri became part of the Erivan Province within Safavid Persia. At the beginning of the 18th century, the region was involved in the liberation campaign of the Armenians of Syunik led by David Bek against Safavid Persia and the invading Ottoman Turks. David Bek began his campaign in 1722 with the help of thousands of local Armenian patriots who liberated Syunik. He united the Armenian nobility in the region to form the Principality of Kapan, which included Meghri. David Bek rebuilt the Meghri Fortress in the 18th century, making it the only Armenian fortress specifically built for firearms. In 1727, 400 of David Bek’s soldiers held off a large Ottoman advance in the fortress. Local Armenian rule of the region lasted until 1747, when the region was brought back under Persian control as part of the Nakhichevan Khanate and then the Karabakh Khanate in 1750.

During the Russo-Persian war of 1804-1813, Meghri became a notable center for military operations in the region. In early 1810, Shah Abbas-Mirza sent thirty thousand troops to Nakhichevan in order to invade the Karabakh Khanate and go on to seize Georgia. Having crossed the Aras river on May 15, the Persians occupied Meghri. In response, the commander of the Karabakh detachment of Russian troops, Major General Pyotr Nebolsin, sent a detachment battalion of about 500 people under the command of Colonel Pyotr Kotlyarevsky with the task of reconquering Meghri, which, due to its strategic position, was known as the “key to Karabakh and Tabriz.” The Persian garrison in Meghri consisted of 1,500 regular Persian infantry (Sarbaz) with artillery stationed on the right, steep bank of the Meghri River. The Persians  heavily fortified the villages, which was defended by two hundred sarbaz. Divided into three columns, the Russian detachment secretly approached Meghri along the valley of the Aras River and on the morning of June 17 suddenly attacked the central fortification of the Persians, broke into the village and, after a stubborn battle, captured it. The Persians lost more than 300 people, the losses of the Russian detachment amounted to 35 people. Subsequent attempts by the Persian troops to return Meghri were unsuccessful.

In 1810, young British army officer William Monteith visited the region as part of his service with the British embassy to Persia. His 1856 memoirs paint a vivid picture of the Meghri valley which he describes as a "romantic glen" that he rates as "one of the most beautiful in Persia, or indeed in any country." He notes that "in former times [it] has evidently been densely peopled for churches, abandoned but still perfect, are thickly scattered on the slopes of the mountains, which here rise to a height on the western side of 8000 to 10,000 feet, covered with forests. The trees are of no great size, and much interspersed with apple, pear, and walnut, probably the remains of former gardens, or produced by seeds carried by the birds and wind into the once cultivated land."

He describes the settlement of Meghri itself as being divided into two sections, each about half a mile from the river Araz, and separated by "small enclosed gardens, surrounded by vines". At the time, Russians controlled the larger village on the north side; the Persians occupied Little Meghri. The Araz he describes as being here a rapid foaming torrent, fordable only in one place, about a mile and a half farther up the river.

In 1813, Meghri became part of the Russian Empire as a result of the Russo-Persian War of 1804–13 and the signing of the Treaty of Gulistan. It was included within the Karabakh province until 1868 when it became part of the newly-formed Zangezur uezd of the Elizavetpol Governorate.

In 1881, the first mixed school was opened in Meghri. In 1901, a consumers' co-operative was opened in Meghri, which was the first of its type in Armenia.

Modern history 

With the establishment of the Republic of Armenia in 1918, Meghri was included within the Zangezur region of the newly-founded republic. However, after the fall of the republic in December 1920, the 2nd Pan-Zangezurian congress held in Tatev on 26 April 1921, announced the independence of the self-governing regions of Daralakyaz (Vayots Dzor), Zangezur -including Meghri-, and parts of Mountainous Artsakh, under the name of the Republic of Mountainous Armenia (Lernahaystani Hanrapetutyun). However, the self-proclaimed republic had a short life, when the Red Army conducted massive military operations in the region during June–July 1921, attacking Syunik from the north and east. As a result of fierce battles, the Republic of Mountainous Armenia capitulated on 13 July 1921, following Soviet Russia's promises to keep the mountainous region of Syunik as part of Soviet Armenia.

The Soviets established the Meghri raion in September 1930, and the settlement of Meghri became the centre of the newly-formed raion. In 1959, Meghri was given the status of an urban-type settlement. In 1984, Meghri was granted with the status of a town. It was developed as a centre of food industry based on the local agricultural products of the region.

After the independence of Armenia, Meghri was included within the newly-formed Syunik Province, as per the administrative reforms of 1995.

Geography 

At an average height of 610 meters above sea level, Meghri is located near the Armenia-Iran border, on the shores of Meghri River, dominated by Zangezur Mountains from the northeast, and Meghri range from the southwest.

The town is mainly divided into 2 large neighborhoods: 
Mets tagh meaning the large neighborhood, located on the left bank of Meghri river, it occupies the eastern part of Meghri. Formed during the 17th century, it occupies around 70% of the town's area.
Pokr tagh meaning the small neighborhood, located on the right bank of Meghri river, it occupies the western part of Meghri. It was formed during the Soviet days in the 20th century.

The 2 neighborhoods are separated by the Meghri river and Adelyan Street.

The surrounding areas of the town are designated as a Prime Butterfly Area, having number of rare and endangered species of butterflies, such as Gegenes nostradamus, Papilio alexanor, Cupido argiades, Polyommatus damonides, and others.

Climate 
The climate here is classified as BSk by the Köppen-Geiger system, with cool winters and hot summers. Spring is the wettest season, while summer is the driest.

Demographics 

Meghri is almost entirely populated by Armenians who belong to the Armenian Apostolic Church. The Church of the Holy Mother of God of Meghri of the large neighborhood opened in 1673, is the main church of the town. It is under the jurisdiction of the Diocese of Syunik based in Goris.

The town of Meghri has experienced relative population growth since the 19th century and especially during the Soviet years when several factories were set up there. In 1831 it was only a village with 272 inhabitants, in 1897 it already had 927 people. It continued to grow in the following decades and peaked in 2011, when, according to that year's census, it had 4,580 inhabitants but due to the country's economic crisis the population declined to 3,500 in 2016.

Culture 

Meghri has a public library founded in 1882. The municipality also runs the cultural centre and the children's school of art. A branch of Yerevan fine arts teaching centre was opened in Meghri in 1985.

The remains of Meghri Fortress dating back to the 11th century are found at the eastern heights of the town. In addition to the Holy Mother of God Church of 1673, the 17th century Surp Hovhannes church located in the small neighborhood is also active and famous for its wall paintings. The abandoned church of Surp Sarkis located at the north of Meghri, is also dating back to the 17the century.

Transportation 

Meghri is the main gate between Armenia and Iran through the nearby Agarak border crossing. The M-2 road that connects the capital Yerevan with Iran, passes through Meghri.

During the Soviet days, Meghri was connected with Yerevan by railway passing through the Nakhichevan Autonomous Soviet Socialist Republic. After the dissolution of Soviet Union and as a result of the military conflict between Armenia and Azerbaijan, the railroad became abandoned.

Economy 

The town's economy is based on food industry, which contains a bread-baking factory, canneries and small home-based wineries. Meghri used to have a large wine factory during the Soviet years.

Agriculture is among the leading sectors in the region. Meghri is the only location in Armenia that produces pomegranate. The region is also known for its high-quality fig. Meghri has a significantly milder climate than the rest of the cities in Armenia, and produces fruits not found in other parts of the country.

The Iran-Armenia Natural Gas Pipeline passes through Meghri. In early 2007, it was reported that the governments of Armenia, Russia, and Iran are planning to build an oil refinery for gasoline export to Iran. This US$1.7 billion project would be led by Gazprom whose Armenian subsidiary is already the country's main energy supplier though in 2016 a new agreement opened up the possibility of having Meghri area's domestic gas supply (around 5000 households) to be provided by Iranian company Sanergy.

The Meghri Dam (also known as the Meghri Hydroelectric Project or Aras Watershed Dam) is a hydroelectric system planned on the Aras River near Meghri on the Armenia–Iran border. The construction was to have begun in 2012. The joint project was proposed and discussed earlier in the 1990s between Iranian and Armenian authorities.

In June 2016, the Meghri Medical Center was opened with the presence of then-president Serzh Sargsyan.

Tourism 

Although the region is unique for its climate and abundant honey and fruit production (pomegranate, one of the national symbols of Armenia is only cultivated in Meghri), landscapes with rocky mountain ranges, the Aras River, an equally unique cultural heritage that is partly influenced by the Persian culture, for example, the murals of the local church, recently renovated thanks to a US subsidy, the remoteness of the country’s capital and the complicated conditions of the mountain roads lengthen the drive and therefore few tourists choose it. Visitors to the area are mostly adventurers who visit Armenia with the aim of later reaching Iran and, as Meghri is located right on the border, is visited by such tourists.

According to the Meghri administration, there are a total of 11 small hotels and hostels offering 170 rooms with 171 beds, despite the annual average number of guests reaching only 6580 people.

According to the State Tourism Committee of Armenia, about 220,000 Iranians visited Armenia in 2017, which is 16% more than in 2016 (about 185,000). The trend implies that the Meghri region has significant potential of tourism development. However, it lacks the capacity to host even a third of Iranian tourists. This is why people prefer other cities or choose a direct trip to Yerevan by visiting the region.

In the city there is an inn called Arevik which has between 8 and 10 beds created to somehow welcome tourists but due to the distances between Yerevan and Meghri there is not much investment because entrepreneurs are afraid of not receiving income and lack infrastructure.

To revive the city a program was created that would arouse the interest of tourists to the region. It consists of four main components: development planning, reconstruction of the neighborhood, capacity building and advertising of Meghri as a new tourist destination. Developing planning means creating a professional base to provide hospitality services with local traditions.

Education 
As of 2017, Meghri is home to 2 public high schools. It also has a pre-school kindergarten ran by the municipality. In 2001, an intermediate technical college was opened in Meghri, preparing teachers, accountants and mechanists.

Sport 
Meghri has a sports school served by a football training field and 2 swimming pools located at the centre of the city in the small neighborhood, on the right bank of Meghri river.

Notable people 

 Yohannes Gugarats
 Khachatur Malumian, writer and political activist, victim of the Armenian genocide
 Paramaz (born Matteos Sarkissian), Armenian fedayee and political activist

Gallery

See also 
Kingdom of Syunik
Meghri Dam

References

External links 

Meghri news
Syunik Province official website

Communities in Syunik Province
Populated places in Syunik Province
Elizavetpol Governorate
906 establishments
Populated places established in the 10th century